Carl Fürstenberg (August 28, 1850 in Danzig – February 9, 1933 in Berlin) was one of the most prominent German bankers of the late nineteenth and early twentieth century, and was responsible for the revival of the German mining industry during his era.
Fürstenberg was born to Jewish parents  in Danzig (Gdańsk). While working at a West Prussian textile mill throughout his childhood, he apprenticed under local banker R. Damme. At the age of seventeen, he moved to Berlin.

At first, Fürstenberg worked for the textile company of Gebr. Simon (Simon Bros.). Two years later, he became an employee at the Disconto-Gesellschaft, one of the leading German joint-stock banks. In 1871, he defected to aristocrat Gerson von Bleichröder's well-known S. Bleichröder Bank, working in the firm as a départemental manager. In 1883, he became first director of the joint-stock bank Berliner Handels-Gesellschaft (B. G.-H.) and dominated it during the next decades in a way, that the bank was often regarded as Fürstenberg's bank. In 1884 he was accepted into the Gesellschaft der Freunde society. Under Fürstenberg, the B. G.-H. became the house bank of Emil Rathenau's AEG. 1902, Fürstenberg made Emil Rathenau's son, Walther Rathenau a co-director of the B. G.-H. which he remained until 1907.

Fuerstenberg was involved in the development of the diamond industry in German South West Africa (now Namibia). He also organized the construction of a railway line between Lüderitz Bay and Kubub.

In 1901, Fürstenberg received the Cross of Commander with Star of the Order of Franz Joseph.

Fürstenberg died in Berlin in 1933.

References 

 Fürstenberg, Carl: Die Lebensgeschichte eines deutschen Bankiers 1870-1914, ed. by Hans Fürstenberg; Berlin: Ullstein 1931.

External links
 

1850 births
1933 deaths
19th-century German Jews
Businesspeople from Gdańsk
German bankers
Jewish bankers
People from the Province of Prussia

Commanders of the Order of Franz Joseph